"What I Did Right" is a song recorded by American country music group Sons of the Desert.  It was released in February 2001 as the third single from the album Change.  The song reached number 22 on the Billboard Hot Country Singles & Tracks chart. Lead singer Drew Womack wrote the song with Sonny LeMaire.

Content
The song is a ballad about treasuring moments in the narrator's life, using three examples: an expression of pride from a grandfather who fought in World War II, of love from the narrator's wife, and of comfort from the narrator's newborn daughter. All three examples are connected by a chorus stating "I'll take this one day and figure out what I did right / And I'll do it the same way for the rest of my life."

Critical reception
Deborah Evans Price of Billboard reviewed the song favorably, saying that "Like 'I Hope You Dance'…the song will touch a universal chord with everyone who has experienced a moment so perfect they wish they could capture it and live it over again."

Chart performance

References

2001 singles
2000 songs
Sons of the Desert (band) songs
Songs written by Sonny LeMaire
Song recordings produced by Mark Wright (record producer)
MCA Nashville Records singles